Abdellatif "Bouchy" Aboukoura (Arabic: عبداللطيف ابو قورة; born October 16, 2004) is an American professional soccer player who plays for Loudoun United FC in the USL Championship. Born in the United States, he has trained with youth teams for both the United States and Egypt.

Career 
On May 16, 2021, Aboukoura made his professional debut at age 16 for Loudoun United.

On April 16, 2022, Aboukoura scored his first professional goal for Loudoun United, in a 1–4 away loss to Oakland Roots. Aboukoura scored subsequent goals for United in matches against Phoenix Rising and New York Red Bulls II.

International 
Aboukoura is eligible to represent both the United States and Egypt at international level. Born in Fairfax, Virginia, to Egyptian parents, Aboukoura was called into a United States under-17 training camp in 2021, but didn't join due to injury. In March 2022, Aboukoura trained with the Egyptian under-20 national team, ahead of their friendly against Slovenia. Aboukoura was again selected for the Egyptian U-20 squad in July 2022, joining the team for the 2022 Arab Cup U-20.

Statistics

References

External links 
 Abdellatif Aboukoura at USL Championship
 Abdellatif Aboukoura at TopDrawer Soccer

2004 births
Living people
American people of Egyptian descent
Egyptian footballers
Egyptian expatriate footballers
Egyptian expatriates in the United States
Loudoun United FC players
Soccer players from Virginia
Sportspeople from Fairfax, Virginia
USL Championship players